Shanghai Indoor Stadium, also known as the Shanghai Grand Stage, is a multi-purpose gymnasium in Shanghai.

Hailed as a great feat of engineering at the time of its construction, the building is now considered dated and out-classed by newly constructed sporting facilities nearby. It is now used for entertainment events and sporting competitions, like table tennis.

Name 
The Shanghai Indoor Stadium is located close to Shanghai Stadium. The two facilities have very similar names in Chinese – the Shanghai Indoor Stadium is literally called a "Sports Arena" while the Shanghai Stadium is called a "Sports Field" – while in English their names differ only by the addition of "Indoor". This poor translation has been a source of confusion, especially after the opening of Shanghai Metro Line 4 with adjacent stations of these names.

When serving as a concert venue, it is often referred to as Shanghai Grand Stage or Shanghai Gymnasium. It is also the venue for the annual Shanghai Masters snooker championship, a major event on the international snooker calendar.

Notable events

Concerts by international performers 
2001-2009
 20 February 2001: La Luna World Tour - Sarah Brightman
 19&21 September 2004: Elton John 2004 Tour - Elton John
 12 December 2005: Michael Bolton 
 18 January 2006: Never Gone Tour - Backstreet Boys
 8 April 2006: A Bigger Bang Tour - The Rolling Stones
 15 May 2006: Robin Gibb
 26 June 2006: Face To Face Tour - Westlife
 20 July 2006: Monkey Business Tour - The Black Eyed Peas
 20 January 2007: Eric Clapton
 12 February 2007: The Dark Side of the Moon Live - Roger Waters
 26 June 2007: Back to Basics Tour - Christina Aguilera
 5 November 2007: The Beyoncé Experience - Beyoncé
 3 November 2008: Glow in the Dark Tour - Kanye West
 27 March 2009: The Symphony World Tour - Sarah Brightman
3 May 2009: Sleepless Night - Vitas

2010-2016
 8 April 2011: Never Ending Tour 2011 - Bob Dylan
 2 May 2011: The Black Star Tour - Avril Lavigne
 26 July 2011: The Cranberries
 9 August 2011：Suede
 25 February 2012: Greatest Hits - Westlife
 4 April 2012:Screaming Bloody Murder Tour - Sum 41 
 28 May 2013: In a World Like This Tour - Backstreet Boys
 23 June 2013: Dreamchaser World Tour - Sarah Brightman
 20 August 2013: Electric Tour - Pet Shop Boys
 2 November 2013: Native Tour - OneRepublic
 21 September 2014: You and Me Tour - Shane Filan of Westlife
 1 April 2015: Jason Mraz
 19 August 2015: Smoke + Mirrors Tour - Imagine Dragons
 8 October 2015: Megadeth
 27 February 2016: Sounds Live Feels Live World Tour - 5 Seconds Of Summer
 4 October 2016: Kesha

Domestic, Asian & other events 

 30 and 31 May 1997: ID Tour – Aska Concert Tour 1997
 26 and 27 November 1999: Asian Tour No Doubt – Chage & Aska Asian Tour 1999
 22 April 2007: Tour of Secret – Ayumi Hamasaki Asia Tour 2007
 17 November 2007: Alive in live – Chage & Aska Asian Tour 2007
 22 November 2008: 1st Asia Tour: Super Show – Super Junior, in front of 11,000 people
 11 and 12 July 2009: BEST FICTION TOUR 2008–2009 – Namie Amuro
 6 and 7 March 2010: 2nd Asia Tour: Super Show 2 – Super Junior, in front of 22,000 people.
7 November 2010: JYJ The Beginning Showcase World Tour (2010)-JYJ
 17 April 2010: 1st Asia Tour: Into The New World – Girls' Generation, in front of 7,000 people
 30 October 2011: X Japan
 14 March 2012: Charm School World Tour – Roxette
 30 April 2012: 2012 Shinhwa Grand Tour in Shanghai: The Return - Shinhwa
 11 April 2014: AON: All Or Nothing World Tour 2014 - 2NE1
 17 January 2015: Worldwide Inner Circle Conference: WWIC 2015 - WINNER
 30 May 2015: Pink Paradise - Apink
 7 October 2015: Zhang Yixing 2nd Birthday Concert - Lay
 25 October 2015:''SHINee Concert: "SHINee World IV 2015" - SHINee
 February 2016: Dota 2 Asia Championships
 2 April 2017: X NINE Shanghai Live Concert

Transportation 

Shanghai Indoor Stadium can be reached by taking Shanghai Metro Line 1 or Line 4 to the Shanghai Indoor Stadium station. The Caoxi Road Public Transport Hub as well as Caoxi Road Station, part of Metro Line 3, is located just to the south of it.

References

External links 

Sports venues completed in 1975
1975 establishments in China
Indoor arenas in China
Sports venues in Shanghai
Snooker venues